Doksy is a municipality and village in Kladno District in the Central Bohemian Region of the Czech Republic. It has about 1,700 inhabitants.

Etymology
The village was formerly known as Dogz or Dogza, in German Doges. It is derived from an Old English word dox, i.e. "dark".

Geography
It is located in the Křivoklát Highlands. The Loděnice River flows through the southern part of the municipality and supplies Hrázský and Nohavice ponds.

History
Doksy was first mentioned as Dogz in 1385. Sandstone was quarried there at least since the 14th century. The sandstone was used for construction in nearby Prague during the reign of King Charles IV. The quarries ended activity in 1924.

Twin towns – sister cities

Doksy is twinned with:
 Ledro, Italy

References

External links

Villages in Kladno District